The 2017–18 Texas State Bobcats men's basketball team represented Texas State University in the 2017–18 NCAA Division I men's basketball season. The Bobcats, led by fifth-year head coach Danny Kaspar, played their home games at Strahan Coliseum in San Marcos, Texas as members of the Sun Belt Conference. They finished the season 15–18, 7–11 in Sun Belt play to finish in a tie for ninth place. As the No. 9 seed in the Sun Belt tournament, they defeated Coastal Carolina before losing to Louisiana in the quarterfinals.

Previous season
The Bobcats finished the 2016–17 season 22–14, 11–7 in Sun Belt play to finish in a three-way tie for third place. At the Sun Belt tournament they defeated Louisiana–Monroe and UT Arlington before losing in the championship game to Troy. They received an invitation to the CollegeInsider.com Tournament where they defeated Lamar and Idaho before losing in the quarterfinals to Saint Peter's.

Roster

Schedule and results

|-
!colspan=9 style=| Exhibition

|-
!colspan=9 style=| Non-conference regular season

|-
!colspan=9 style=| Sun Belt regular season

|-
!colspan=9 style=| Sun Belt tournament

References

Texas State Bobcats men's basketball seasons
Texas State
Texas State
Texas State